Lucía Zárate (January 2, 1864 – January 15, 1890) was a Mexican entertainer with dwarfism who performed in sideshows. Zárate is the first person to have been identified with Majewski osteodysplastic primordial dwarfism type II. She was entered into the Guinness World Records as the "lightest recorded adult", weighing only  at the age of 17.

Early life
She was born in Veracruz, Mexico, and settled on the Agostadero, (later Cempoala), Veracruz. According to an 1894 article in Strand Magazine, Zárate achieved her full growth by the age of one year. Her family home, Casa Grande (Big House) is open to the public as a museum.

Career
At age twelve, Zárate moved from Mexico over to the United States, where she was exhibited for her small stature. She first worked as part of an act billed as the "Fairy Sisters", later partnering with Francis Joseph Flynn (billed under the stage name "General Mite") to exhibit internationally. In 1889 she was billed in The Washington Post as the "marvelous Mexican midget" and described as "a tiny but all powerful magnet to draw the public."

An 1876 book published by Oxford University discussed a visit to Zárate paid by several medical professionals, who could not certainly verify that she was twelve years old, but they could ascertain through her dental development that she was at least six years old. She weighed 14 pounds (6.4 kg) at her peak at age 20. She was with her parents at the time and found to be healthy and intelligent, able to speak some English along with her native Spanish.

Death
After her circus train became stranded in the snowy Sierra Nevada mountains, Zarate died of hypothermia in 1890.

Notes

External links
 Sideshow world Article with a photo of Zarate

1864 births
1890 deaths
Mexican entertainers
People from Veracruz
Entertainers with dwarfism
Sideshow performers
Deaths from hypothermia
Accidental deaths in California